Myint Myint Aye (born 18 November 1977) is a retired athlete who represented Myanmar in the middle-distance events. She competed in the 800 metres at two World Championships, in 2003 and 2005, without qualifying for the semifinals.

Competition record

Personal bests

400 metres – 56.9h (Yangon 2008)
800 metres – 2:01.80 (Yangon 2005) NR
1500 metres – 4:18.71 (Singapore 2004)

References

1977 births
Living people
Burmese female middle-distance runners
World Athletics Championships athletes for Myanmar
Southeast Asian Games medalists in athletics
Southeast Asian Games gold medalists for Myanmar
Southeast Asian Games silver medalists for Myanmar
Southeast Asian Games bronze medalists for Myanmar
Competitors at the 2003 Southeast Asian Games
Competitors at the 2005 Southeast Asian Games
Competitors at the 2007 Southeast Asian Games